Hassium is a chemical element with the symbol Hs and the atomic number 108. Hassium is highly radioactive; its most stable known isotopes have half-lives of approximately ten seconds. One of its isotopes, 270Hs, has magic numbers of both protons and neutrons for deformed nuclei, which gives it greater stability against spontaneous fission. Hassium is a superheavy element; it has been produced in a laboratory only in very small quantities by fusing heavy nuclei with lighter ones. Natural occurrences of the element have been hypothesised but never found.

In the periodic table of elements, hassium is a transactinide element, a member of the 7th period and group 8; it is thus the sixth member of the 6d series of transition metals. Chemistry experiments have confirmed that hassium behaves as the heavier homologue to osmium, reacting readily with oxygen to form a volatile tetroxide. The chemical properties of hassium have been only partly characterized, but they compare well with the chemistry of the other group 8 elements.

The principal innovation that led to the discovery of hassium was the technique of cold fusion, in which the fused nuclei did not differ by mass as much as in earlier techniques. It relied on greater stability of target nuclei, which in turn decreased excitation energy. This decreased the number of neutron ejections during synthesis, creating heavier, more stable resulting nuclei. The technique was first tested at the Joint Institute for Nuclear Research (JINR) in Dubna, Moscow Oblast, Russian SFSR, Soviet Union, in 1974. JINR used this technique to attempt synthesis of element 108 in 1978, in 1983, and in 1984; the latter experiment resulted in a claim that element 108 had been produced. Later in 1984, a synthesis claim followed from the Gesellschaft für Schwerionenforschung (GSI) in Darmstadt, Hesse, West Germany. The 1993 report by the Transfermium Working Group, formed by the International Union of Pure and Applied Chemistry and the International Union of Pure and Applied Physics, concluded that the report from Darmstadt was conclusive on its own whereas that from Dubna was not, and major credit was assigned to the German scientists. GSI formally announced they wished to name the element hassium after the German state of Hesse (Hassia in Latin) home to the facility in 1992; this name was accepted as final in 1997.

Introduction to the heaviest elements

Discovery

Cold fusion 

Nuclear reactions used in the 1960s resulted in high excitation energies that required expulsion of four or five neutrons; these reactions used targets made of elements with high atomic numbers to maximize the size difference between the two nuclei in a reaction. While this increased the chance of fusion due to the lower electrostatic repulsion between the target and the projectile, the formed compound nuclei often broke apart and did not survive to form a new element. Moreover, fusion processes inevitably produce neutron-poor nuclei, as heavier elements require more neutrons per proton to maximize stability; therefore, the necessary ejection of neutrons results in final products with typically have shorter lifetimes. As such, light beams (six to ten protons) allowed synthesis of elements only up to 106.

To advance to heavier elements, Soviet physicist Yuri Oganessian at the Joint Institute for Nuclear Research (JINR) in Dubna, Moscow Oblast, Russian SFSR, Soviet Union, proposed a different mechanism, in which the bombarded nucleus would be lead-208, which has magic numbers of protons and neutrons, or another nucleus close to it. Each proton and neutron has a fixed value of rest energy; those of all protons are equal and so are those of all neutrons. In a nucleus, some of this energy is diverted to binding protons and neutrons; if a nucleus has a magic number of protons and/or neutrons, then even more of its rest energy is diverted, which gives the nuclide additional stability. This additional stability requires more energy for an external nucleus to break the existing one and penetrate it. More energy diverted to binding nucleons means less rest energy, which in turn means less mass (mass is proportional to rest energy). More equal atomic numbers of the reacting nuclei result in greater electrostatic repulsion between them, but the lower mass excess of the target nucleus balances it. This leaves less excitation energy for the newly created compound nucleus, which necessitates fewer neutron ejections to reach a stable state. Because of this energy difference, the former mechanism became known as "hot fusion" and the latter as "cold fusion".

Cold fusion was first declared successful in 1974 at JINR, when it was tested for synthesis of the yet-undiscovered element106. These new nuclei were projected to decay via spontaneous fission. The physicists at JINR concluded element 106 was produced in the experiment because no fissioning nucleus known at the time showed parameters of fission similar to what was observed during the experiment and because changing either of the two nuclei in the reactions negated the observed effects. Physicists at the Lawrence Berkeley Laboratory (LBL; originally Radiation Laboratory, RL, and later Lawrence Berkeley National Laboratory, LBNL) of the University of California in Berkeley, California, United States, also expressed great interest in the new technique. When asked about how far this new method could go and if lead targets were a physics' Klondike, Oganessian responded, "Klondike may be an exaggeration [...] But soon, we will try to get elements 107... 108 in these reactions."

Reports 

The synthesis of element108 was first attempted in 1978 by a research team led by Oganessian at the JINR. The team used a reaction that would generate element108, specifically, the isotope 270108, from fusion of radium (specifically, the isotope  and calcium . The researchers were uncertain in interpreting their data, and their paper did not unambiguously claim to have discovered the element. The same year, another team at JINR investigated the possibility of synthesis of element108 in reactions between lead  and iron ; they were uncertain in interpreting the data, suggesting the possibility that element108 had not been created.

In 1983, new experiments were performed at JINR. The experiments probably resulted in the synthesis of element108; bismuth  was bombarded with manganese  to obtain 263108, lead ,  was bombarded with iron  to obtain 264108, and californium  was bombarded with neon  to obtain 270108. These experiments were not claimed as a discovery and Oganessian announced them in a conference rather than in a written report.

In 1984, JINR researchers in Dubna performed experiments set up identically to the previous ones; they bombarded bismuth and lead targets with ions of lighter elements manganese and iron, respectively. Twenty-one spontaneous fission events were recorded; the researchers concluded they were caused by 264108.

Later in 1984, a research team led by Peter Armbruster and Gottfried Münzenberg at Gesellschaft für Schwerionenforschung (GSI; Institute for Heavy Ion Research) in Darmstadt, Hesse, West Germany, attempted to create element108. The team bombarded a lead  target with accelerated iron  nuclei. GSI's experiment to create element108 was delayed until after their creation of element109 in 1982, as prior calculations had suggested that even–even isotopes of element108 would have spontaneous fission half-lives of less than one microsecond, making them difficult to detect and identify. The element108 experiment finally went ahead after 266109 had been synthesized and was found to decay by alpha emission, suggesting that isotopes of element108 would do likewise, and this was corroborated by an experiment aimed at synthesizing isotopes of element106. GSI reported synthesis of three atoms of 265108. Two years later, they reported synthesis of one atom of the even–even 264108.

Arbitration 

In 1985, the International Union of Pure and Applied Chemistry (IUPAC) and the International Union of Pure and Applied Physics (IUPAP) formed the Transfermium Working Group (TWG) to assess discoveries and establish final names for elements with atomic numbers greater than 100. The party held meetings with delegates from the three competing institutes; in 1990, they established criteria for recognition of an element and in 1991, they finished the work of assessing discoveries and disbanded. These results were published in 1993.

According to the report, the 1984 works from JINR and GSI simultaneously and independently established synthesis of element108. Of the two 1984 works, the one from GSI was said to be sufficient as a discovery on its own. The JINR work, which preceded the GSI one, "very probably" displayed synthesis of element108. However, that was determined in retrospect given the work from Darmstadt; the JINR work focused on chemically identifying remote granddaughters of element108 isotopes (which could not exclude the possibility that these daughter isotopes had other progenitors), while the GSI work clearly identified the decay path of those element108 isotopes. The report concluded that the major credit should be awarded to GSI. In written responses to this ruling, both JINR and GSI agreed with its conclusions. In the same response, GSI confirmed that they and JINR were able to resolve all conflicts between them.

Naming 

Historically, a newly discovered element was named by its discoverer. The first regulation came in 1947, when IUPAC decided naming required regulation in case there are conflicting names. These matters were to be resolved by the Commission of Inorganic Nomenclature and the Commission of Atomic Weights. They would review the names in case of a conflict and select one; the decision would be based on a number of factors, such as usage, and would not be an indicator of priority of a claim. The two commissions would recommend a name to the IUPAC Council, which would be the final authority. The discoverers held the right to name an element, but their name would be subject to approval by IUPAC. The Commission of Atomic Weights distanced itself from element naming in most cases.

Under Mendeleev's nomenclature for unnamed and undiscovered elements, hassium would be known as "eka-osmium", as in "the first element below osmium in the periodic table" (from Sanskrit eka meaning "one"). In 1979, IUPAC published recommendations according to which the element was to be called "unniloctium" and assigned the corresponding symbol of "Uno", a systematic element name as a placeholder until the element was discovered and the discovery then confirmed, and a permanent name was decided. Although these recommendations were widely followed in the chemical community, the competing physicists in the field ignored them. They either called it "element108", with the symbols E108, (108) or 108, or used the proposed name "hassium".

In 1990, in an attempt to break a deadlock in establishing priority of discovery and naming of several elements, IUPAC reaffirmed in its nomenclature of inorganic chemistry that after existence of an element was established, the discoverers could propose a name. (In addition, the Commission of Atomic Weights was excluded from the naming process.) The first publication on criteria for an element discovery, released in 1991, specified the need for recognition by TWG.

Armbruster and his colleagues, the officially recognized German discoverers, held a naming ceremony for the elements 107 through 109, which had all been recognized as discovered by GSI, on 7September 1992. For element108, the scientists proposed the name "hassium". It is derived from the Latin name Hassia for the German state of Hesse where the institute is located. This name was proposed to IUPAC in a written response to their ruling on priority of discovery claims of elements, signed 29 September 1992.

The process of naming of element 108 was a part of a larger process of naming a number of elements starting with element 101; three teams—JINR, GSI, and LBL—claimed discoveries of several elements and the right to name those elements. Sometimes, these claims clashed; since a discoverer was considered entitled to naming of an element, conflicts over priority of discovery often resulted in conflicts over names of these new elements. These conflicts became known as the Transfermium Wars. Different suggestions to name the whole set of elements from 101 onward and they occasionally assigned names suggested by one team to be used for elements discovered by another. However, not all suggestions were met with equal approval; the teams openly protested naming proposals on several occasions.

In 1994, IUPAC Commission on Nomenclature of Inorganic Chemistry recommended that element108 be named "hahnium" (Hn) after the German physicist Otto Hahn so elements named after Hahn and Lise Meitner (it was recommended element109 should be named meitnerium, following GSI's suggestion) would be next to each other, honouring their joint discovery of nuclear fission; IUPAC commented that they felt the German suggestion was obscure. GSI protested, saying this proposal contradicted the long-standing convention of giving the discoverer the right to suggest a name; the American Chemical Society supported GSI. The name "hahnium", albeit with the different symbol Ha, had already been proposed and used by the American scientists for element105, for which they had a discovery dispute with JINR; they thus protested the confusing scrambling of names. Following the uproar, IUPAC formed an ad hoc committee of representatives from the national adhering organizations of the three countries home to the competing institutions; they produced a new set of names in 1995. Element108 was again named hahnium; this proposal was also retracted. The final compromise was reached in 1996 and published in 1997; element108 was named hassium (Hs). Simultaneously, the name dubnium (Db; from Dubna, the JINR location) was assigned to element105, and the name hahnium was not used for any element.

The official justification for this naming, alongside that of darmstadtium for element110, was that it completed a set of geographic names for the location of the GSI; this set had been initiated by 19th-century names europium and germanium. This set would serve as a response to earlier naming of americium, californium, and berkelium for elements discovered in Berkeley. Armbruster commented on this, "this bad tradition was established by Berkeley. We wanted to do it for Europe." Later, when commenting on the naming of element112, Armbruster said, "I did everything to ensure that we do not continue with German scientists and German towns."

Isotopes 

Hassium has no stable or naturally occurring isotopes. Several radioactive isotopes have been synthesized in the laboratory, either by fusing two atoms or by observing the decay of heavier elements. As of 2019, the quantity of all hassium ever produced was on the order of hundreds of atoms. Thirteen isotopes with mass numbers ranging from 263 to 277 (with the exceptions of 274 and 276) have been reported, four of which—hassium-265, -266, -267, and -277—have known metastable states, although that of hassium-277 is unconfirmed. Most of these isotopes decay predominantly through alpha decay; this is the most common for all isotopes for which comprehensive decay characteristics are available, the only exception being hassium-277, which undergoes spontaneous fission. Lighter isotopes were usually synthesized by direct fusion between two lighter nuclei, whereas heavier isotopes were typically observed as decay products of nuclei with larger atomic numbers.

Atomic nuclei have well-established nuclear shells, and the existence of these shells provides nuclei with additional stability. If a nucleus has certain numbers of protons or neutrons, called magic numbers, that complete certain nuclear shells, then the nucleus is even more stable against decay. The highest known magic numbers are 82 for protons and 126 for neutrons. This notion is sometimes expanded to include additional numbers between those magic numbers, which also provide some additional stability and indicate closure of "sub-shells". In contrast to the better-known lighter nuclei, superheavy nuclei are deformed. Until the 1960s, the liquid drop model was the dominant explanation for nuclear structure. It suggested that the fission barrier would disappear for nuclei with about 280nucleons. It was thus thought that spontaneous fission would occur nearly instantly before nuclei could form a structure that could stabilize them; it appeared that nuclei with Z≈103 were too heavy to exist for a considerable length of time.

The later nuclear shell model suggested that nuclei with about three hundred nucleons would form an island of stability in which nuclei will be more resistant to spontaneous fission and will primarily undergo alpha decay with longer half-lives, and the next doubly magic nucleus (having magic numbers of both protons and neutrons) is expected to lie in the center of the island of stability in the vicinity of Z=110–114 and the predicted magic neutron number N=184. Subsequent discoveries suggested that the predicted island might be further than originally anticipated; they also showed that nuclei intermediate between the long-lived actinides and the predicted island are deformed, and gain additional stability from shell effects. The addition to the stability against the spontaneous fission should be particularly great against spontaneous fission, although increase in stability against the alpha decay would also be pronounced. The center of the region on a chart of nuclides that would correspond to this stability for deformed nuclei was determined as 270Hs, with 108 expected to be a magic number for protons for deformed nuclei—nuclei that are far from spherical—and 162 a magic number for neutrons for such nuclei. Experiments on lighter superheavy nuclei, as well as those closer to the expected island, have shown greater than previously anticipated stability against spontaneous fission, showing the importance of shell effects on nuclei.

Theoretical models predict a region of instability for some hassium isotopes to lie around A=275 and N=168–170, which is between the predicted neutron shell closures at N=162 for deformed nuclei and N=184 for spherical nuclei. Nuclides within this region are predicted to have low fission barrier heights, resulting in short partial half-lives toward spontaneous fission. This prediction is supported by the observed eleven-millisecond half-life of 277Hs and the five-millisecond half-life of the neighbouring isobar 277Mt because the hindrance factors from the odd nucleon were shown to be much lower than otherwise expected. The measured half-lives are even lower than those originally predicted for the even–even 276Hs and 278Ds, which suggests a gap in stability away from the shell closures and perhaps a weakening of the shell closures in this region.

In 1991, Polish physicists Zygmunt Patyk and Adam Sobiczewski predicted that 108 is a proton magic number for deformed nuclei and 162 is a neutron magic number for such nuclei. This means such nuclei are permanently deformed in their ground state but have high, narrow fission barriers to further deformation and hence relatively long life-times toward spontaneous fission. Computational prospects for shell stabilization for 270Hs made it a promising candidate for a deformed doubly magic nucleus. Experimental data is scarce, but the existing data is interpreted by the researchers to support the assignment of N=162 as a magic number. In particular, this conclusion was drawn from the decay data of 269Hs, 270Hs, and 271Hs. In 1997, Polish physicist Robert Smolańczuk calculated that the isotope 292Hs may be the most stable superheavy nucleus against alpha decay and spontaneous fission as a consequence of the predicted N=184 shell closure.

Natural occurrence 

Hassium is not known to occur naturally on Earth; the half-lives of all its known isotopes are short enough that no primordial hassium would have survived to the present day. This does not rule out the possibility of the existence of unknown, longer-lived isotopes or nuclear isomers, some of which could still exist in trace quantities if they are long-lived enough. As early as 1914, German physicist Richard Swinne proposed element108 as a source of X-rays in the Greenland ice sheet. Although Swinne was unable to verify this observation and thus did not claim discovery, he proposed in 1931 the existence of "regions" of long-lived transuranic elements, including one around Z=108.

In 1963, Soviet geologist and physicist Viktor Cherdyntsev, who had previously claimed the existence of primordial curium-247, claimed to have discovered element108—specifically the 267108 isotope, which supposedly had a half-life of 400 to 500million years—in natural molybdenite and suggested the provisional name sergenium (symbol Sg); this name takes its origin from the name for the Silk Road and was explained as "coming from Kazakhstan" for it. His rationale for claiming that sergenium was the heavier homologue to osmium was that minerals supposedly containing sergenium formed volatile oxides when boiled in nitric acid, similarly to osmium.

Cherdyntsev's findings were criticized by Soviet physicist Vladimir Kulakov on the grounds that some of the properties Cherdyntsev claimed sergenium had were inconsistent with the then-current nuclear physics. The chief questions raised by Kulakov were that the claimed alpha decay energy of sergenium was many orders of magnitude lower than expected and the half-life given was eight orders of magnitude shorter than what would be predicted for a nuclide alpha-decaying with the claimed decay energy. At the same time, a corrected half-life in the region of 1016years would be impossible because it would imply the samples contained about a hundred milligrams of sergenium. In 2003, it was suggested that the observed alpha decay with energy 4.5MeV could be due to a low-energy and strongly enhanced transition between different hyperdeformed states of a hassium isotope around 271Hs, thus suggesting that the existence of superheavy elements in nature was at least possible, although unlikely.

In 2006, Russian geologist Alexei Ivanov hypothesized that an isomer of 271Hs might have a half-life of around  years, which would explain the observation of alpha particles with energies of around 4.4MeV in some samples of molybdenite and osmiridium. This isomer of 271Hs could be produced from the beta decay of 271Bh and 271Sg, which, being homologous to rhenium and molybdenum respectively, should occur in molybdenite along with rhenium and molybdenum if they occurred in nature. Because hassium is homologous to osmium, it should occur along with osmium in osmiridium if it occurs in nature. The decay chains of 271Bh and 271Sg are hypothetical and the predicted half-life of this hypothetical hassium isomer is not long enough for any sufficient quantity to remain on Earth. It is possible that more 271Hs may be deposited on the Earth as the Solar System travels through the spiral arms of the Milky Way; this would explain excesses of plutonium-239 found on the ocean floors of the Pacific Ocean and the Gulf of Finland. However, minerals enriched with 271Hs are predicted to have excesses of its daughters uranium-235 and lead-207; they would also have different proportions of elements that are formed during spontaneous fission, such as krypton, zirconium, and xenon. The natural occurrence of hassium in minerals such as molybdenite and osmiride is theoretically possible, but very unlikely.

In 2004, JINR started a search for natural hassium in the Modane Underground Laboratory in Modane, Auvergne-Rhône-Alpes, France; this was done underground to avoid interference and false positives from cosmic rays. In 2008–09, an experiment run in the laboratory resulted in detection of several registered events of neutron multiplicity (number of emitted free neutrons after a nucleus hit has been hit by a neutron and fissioned) above three in natural osmium, and in 2012–13, these findings were reaffirmed in another experiment run in the laboratory. These results hinted natural hassium could potentially exist in nature in amounts that allow its detection by the means of analytical chemistry, but this conclusion is based on an explicit assumption that there is a long-lived hassium isotope to which the registered events could be attributed.

Since 292Hs may be particularly stable against alpha decay and spontaneous fission, it was considered as a candidate to exist in nature. This nuclide, however, is predicted to be very unstable toward beta decay and any beta-stable isotopes of hassium such as 286Hs would be too unstable in the other decay channels to be observed in nature.

Predicted properties 

Various calculations suggest hassium should be the heaviest group 8 element so far, consistently with the periodic law. Its properties should generally match those expected for a heavier homologue of osmium; as is the case for all transactinides, a few deviations are expected to arise from relativistic effects.

Very few properties of hassium or its compounds have been measured; this is due to its extremely limited and expensive production and the fact that hassium (and its parents) decays very quickly. A few singular chemistry-related properties have been measured, such as enthalpy of adsorption of hassium tetroxide, but properties of hassium metal remain unknown and only predictions are available.

Relativistic effects 

Relativistic effects on hassium should arise due to the high charge of its nuclei, which causes the electrons around the nucleus to move faster—so fast their velocity becomes comparable to the speed of light. There are three main effects: the direct relativistic effect, the indirect relativistic effect, and spin–orbit splitting. (The existing calculations do not account for Breit interactions, but those are negligible, and their omission can only result in an uncertainty of the current calculations of no more than 2%.)

As atomic number increases, so does the electrostatic attraction between an electron and the nucleus. This causes the velocity of the electron to increase, which leads to an increase in its mass. This in turn leads to contraction of the atomic orbitals, most specifically the s and p1/2 orbitals. Their electrons become more closely attached to the atom and harder to pull from the nucleus. This is the direct relativistic effect. It was originally thought to be strong only for the innermost electrons, but was later established to significantly influence valence electrons as well.

Since the s and p1/2 orbitals are closer to the nucleus, they take a bigger portion of the electric charge of the nucleus on themselves ("shield" it). This leaves less charge for attraction of the remaining electrons, whose orbitals therefore expand, making them easier to pull from the nucleus. This is the indirect relativistic effect. As a result of the combination of the direct and indirect relativistic effects, the Hs+ ion, compared to the neutral atom, lacks a 6d electron, rather than a 7s electron. In comparison, Os+ lacks a 6s electron compared to the neutral atom. The ionic radius (in oxidation state +8) of hassium is greater than that of osmium because of the relativistic expansion of the 6p3/2 orbitals, which are the outermost orbitals for an Hs8+ ion (although in practice such highly charged ions would be too polarised in chemical environments to have much reality).

There are several kinds of electronic orbitals, denoted by the letters s, p, d, and f (g orbitals are expected to start being chemically active among elements after element 120). Each of these corresponds to an azimuthal quantum number l: s to 0, p to 1, d to 2, and f to 3. Every electron also corresponds to a spin quantum number s, which may equal either +1/2 or −1/2. Thus, the total angular momentum quantum number j = l + s is equal to j = l ± 1/2 (except for l = 0, for which for both electrons in each orbital j = 0 + 1/2 = 1/2). Spin of an electron relativistically interacts with its orbit, and this interaction leads to a split of a subshell into two with different energies (the one with j = l − 1/2 is lower in energy and thus these electrons more difficult to extract): for instance, of the six 6p electrons, two become 6p1/2 and four become 6p3/2. This is the spin–orbit splitting (sometimes also referred to as subshell splitting or jj coupling). It is most visible with p electrons, which do not play an important role in the chemistry of hassium, but those for d and f electrons are within the same order of magnitude (quantitatively, spin–orbit splitting in expressed in energy units, such as electronvolts).

These relativistic effects are responsible for the expected increase of the ionization energy, decrease of the electron affinity, and increase of stability of the +8 oxidation state compared to osmium; without them, the trends would be reversed. Relativistic effects decrease the atomization energies of the compounds of hassium because the spin–orbit splitting of the d orbital lowers binding energy between electrons and the nucleus and because relativistic effects decrease ionic character in bonding.

Physical and atomic 

The previous members of group8 have relatively high melting points: Fe, 1538°C; Ru, 2334°C; Os, 3033°C. Much like them, hassium is predicted to be a solid at room temperature although its melting point has not been precisely calculated. Hassium should crystallize in the hexagonal close-packed structure (c/a=1.59), similarly to its lighter congener osmium. Pure metallic hassium is calculated to have a bulk modulus (resistance to uniform compression) of 450GPa, comparable with that of diamond, 442GPa. Hassium is expected to be one of the densest of the 118 known elements, with a predicted density of 27–29 g/cm3 vs. the 22.59 g/cm3 measured for osmium.

The atomic radius of hassium is expected to be around 126pm. Due to the relativistic stabilization of the 7s orbital and destabilization of the 6d orbital, the Hs+ ion is predicted to have an electron configuration of [Rn]5f146d57s2, giving up a 6d electron instead of a 7s electron, which is the opposite of the behaviour of its lighter homologues. The Hs2+ ion is expected to have an electron configuration of [Rn]5f146d57s1, analogous to that calculated for the Os2+ ion. In chemical compounds, hassium is calculated to display bonding characteristic for a d-block element, whose bonding will be primarily executed by 6d3/2 and 6d5/2 orbitals; compared to the elements from the previous periods, 7s, 6p1/2, 6p3/2, and 7p1/2 orbitals should be more important.

Chemical 

Hassium is the sixth member of the 6d series of transition metals and is expected to be much like the platinum group metals. Some of these properties were confirmed by gas-phase chemistry experiments. The group8 elements portray a wide variety of oxidation states but ruthenium and osmium readily portray their group oxidation state of +8; this state becomes more stable down the group. This oxidation state is extremely rare: among stable elements, only ruthenium, osmium, and xenon are able to attain it in reasonably stable compounds. Hassium is expected to follow its congeners and have a stable +8 state, but like them it should show lower stable oxidation states such as +6, +4, +3, and +2. Hassium(IV) is expected to be more stable than hassium(VIII) in aqueous solution. Hassium should be a rather noble metal. The standard reduction potential for the Hs4+/Hs couple is expected to be 0.4V.

The group 8 elements show a distinctive oxide chemistry. All the lighter members have known or hypothetical tetroxides, MO4. Their oxidizing power decreases as one descends the group. FeO4 is not known due to its extraordinarily large electron affinity—the amount of energy released when an electron is added to a neutral atom or molecule to form a negative ion—which results in the formation of the well-known oxyanion ferrate(VI), . Ruthenium tetroxide, RuO4, which is formed by oxidation of ruthenium(VI) in acid, readily undergoes reduction to ruthenate(VI), . Oxidation of ruthenium metal in air forms the dioxide, RuO2. In contrast, osmium burns to form the stable tetroxide, OsO4, which complexes with the hydroxide ion to form an osmium(VIII) -ate complex, [OsO4(OH)2]2−. Therefore, hassium should behave as a heavier homologue of osmium by forming of a stable, very volatile tetroxide HsO4, which undergoes complexation with hydroxide to form a hassate(VIII), [HsO4(OH)2]2−. Ruthenium tetroxide and osmium tetroxide are both volatile due to their symmetrical tetrahedral molecular geometry and because they are charge-neutral; hassium tetroxide should similarly be a very volatile solid. The trend of the volatilities of the group8 tetroxides is experimentally known to be RuO4<OsO4>HsO4, which confirms the calculated results. In particular, the calculated enthalpies of adsorption—the energy required for the adhesion of atoms, molecules, or ions from a gas, liquid, or dissolved solid to a surface—of HsO4, −(45.4±1)kJ/mol on quartz, agrees very well with the experimental value of −(46±2)kJ/mol.

Experimental chemistry 

The first goal for chemical investigation was the formation of the tetroxide; it was chosen because ruthenium and osmium form volatile tetroxides, being the only transition metals to display a stable compound in the +8 oxidation state. Despite this selection for gas-phase chemical studies being clear from the beginning, chemical characterization of hassium was considered a difficult task for a long time. Although hassium isotopes were first synthesized in 1984, it was not until 1996 that a hassium isotope long-lived enough to allow chemical studies was synthesized. Unfortunately, this hassium isotope, 269Hs, was synthesized indirectly from the decay of 277Cn; not only are indirect synthesis methods not favourable for chemical studies, but the reaction that produced the isotope 277Cn had a low yield—its cross section was only 1pb—and thus did not provide enough hassium atoms for a chemical investigation. Direct synthesis of 269Hs and 270Hs in the reaction 248Cm(26Mg,xn)274−xHs (x=4 or 5) appeared more promising because the cross section for this reaction was somewhat larger at 7pb. This yield was still around ten times lower than that for the reaction used for the chemical characterization of bohrium. New techniques for irradiation, separation, and detection had to be introduced before hassium could be successfully characterized chemically.

Ruthenium and osmium have very similar chemistry due to the lanthanide contraction but iron shows some differences from them; for example, although ruthenium and osmium form stable tetroxides in which the metal is in the +8 oxidation state, iron does not. In preparation for the chemical characterization of hassium, research focused on ruthenium and osmium rather than iron because hassium was expected to be similar to ruthenium and osmium, as the predicted data on hassium closely matched that of those two.

The first chemistry experiments were performed using gas thermochromatography in 2001, using the synthetic osmium radioisotopes 172Os and 173Os as a reference. During the experiment, seven hassium atoms were synthesized using the reactions 248Cm(26Mg,5n)269Hs and 248Cm(26Mg,4n)270Hs. They were then thermalized and oxidized in a mixture of helium and oxygen gases to form hassium tetroxide molecules.

Hs + 2 O2 → HsO4

The measured deposition temperature of hassium tetroxide was higher than that of osmium tetroxide, which indicated the former was the less volatile one, and this placed hassium firmly in group 8. The enthalpy of adsorption for HsO4 measured, was significantly lower than the predicted value, indicating OsO4 is more volatile than HsO4, contradicting earlier calculations that implied they should have very similar volatilities. (The calculations that yielded a closer match to the experimental data came after the experiment, in 2008.) It is possible hassium tetroxide interacts differently with silicon nitride than with silicon dioxide, the chemicals used for the detector; further research is required to establish whether there is a difference between such interactions and whether it has influenced the measurements. Such research would include more accurate measurements of the nuclear properties of 269Hs and comparisons with RuO4 in addition to OsO4.

In 2004, scientists reacted hassium tetroxide and sodium hydroxide to form sodium hassate(VIII), a reaction that is well known with osmium. This was the first acid-base reaction with a hassium compound, forming sodium hassate(VIII):

 + 2 NaOH → 

The team from the University of Mainz planned in 2008 to study the electrodeposition of hassium atoms using the new TASCA facility at GSI. Their aim was to use the reaction 226Ra(48Ca,4n)270Hs. Scientists at GSI were hoping to use TASCA to study the synthesis and properties of the hassium(II) compound hassocene, Hs(C5H5)2, using the reaction 226Ra(48Ca,xn). This compound is analogous to the lighter compounds ferrocene, ruthenocene, and osmocene, and is expected to have the two cyclopentadienyl rings in an eclipsed conformation like ruthenocene and osmocene and not in a staggered conformation like ferrocene. Hassocene, which is expected to be a stable and highly volatile compound, was chosen because it has hassium in the low formal oxidation state of +2—although the bonding between the metal and the rings is mostly covalent in metallocenes—rather than the high +8 state that had previously been investigated, and relativistic effects were expected to be stronger in the lower oxidation state. The highly symmetrical structure of hassocene and its low number of atoms make relativistic calculations easier. , there are no experimental reports of hassocene.

Notes

References

Bibliography

External links

 
Chemical elements
Transition metals
Synthetic elements
Chemical elements with hexagonal close-packed structure